Robert L. Nichols (February 9, 1922 – July 4, 2001) was a lieutenant general in the United States Marine Corps who served as Deputy Chief of Staff for Manpower. He was commissioned in 1944 after enlisting in 1939 and retired in 1978.

References

1922 births
2001 deaths
United States Marine Corps generals
United States Marine Corps personnel of World War II